The 1993 Hockey East Men's Ice Hockey Tournament was the 9th Tournament in the history of the conference. It was played between March 12 and March 20, 1993. Quarterfinal games were played at home team campus sites, while the final four games were played at the Boston Garden in Boston, Massachusetts, the home venue of the NHL's Boston Bruins. By winning the tournament, Maine received the Hockey East's automatic bid to the 1993 NCAA Division I Men's Ice Hockey Tournament.

Format
The tournament featured three rounds of play. In the first round, the first and eighth seeds, the second and seventh seeds, the third seed and sixth seeds, and the fourth seed and fifth seeds played a two-game series where the team that scored the most total goals was declared the winner and advanced to the semifinals. In the semifinals, the highest and lowest seeds and second highest and second lowest seeds play a single-elimination game, with the winners advancing to the championship game and the losers meeting in a third-place game. The tournament champion receives an automatic bid to the 1993 NCAA Division I Men's Ice Hockey Tournament.

Conference standings
Note: GP = Games played; W = Wins; L = Losses; T = Ties; PTS = Points; GF = Goals For; GA = Goals Against

Bracket

Teams are reseeded after the quarterfinals

Note: * denotes overtime period(s)

Quarterfinals

(1) Maine vs. (8) Northeastern

(2) Boston University vs. (7) Boston College

(3) New Hampshire vs. (6) Merrimack

(4) Massachusetts-Lowell vs. (5) Providence

Semifinals

(1) Maine vs. (4) Massachusetts-Lowell

(2) Boston University vs. (3) New Hampshire

Third Place

(3) New Hampshire vs. (4) Massachusetts-Lowell

Championship

(1) Maine vs. (2) Boston University

Tournament awards

All-Tournament Team
F Jim Montgomery* (Maine)
F Michael Murray (Massachusetts-Lowell)
F David Sacco (Boston University)
D Rich Brennan (Boston University)
D Chris Imes (Maine)
G Garth Snow (Maine)
* Tournament MVP(s)

References

External links
Hockey East Online

Hockey East Men's Ice Hockey Tournament
HE tournament